"Rock & Roll Machine" is a 1977 song by hard rock band Triumph from their second album Rock & Roll Machine. The song was written by Gil Moore and had existed as part of Triumph's stage act as far back as 1975. The song was recorded live in studio during the three-week sessions for the album.

Written and sung by drummer/vocalist Gil Moore, the song is noted for its lengthy guitar solo performed by Rik Emmett. A 1983 live version of the song was released in 2003 on the Live at the US Festival album.

1977 songs
Triumph (band) songs
Songs written by Gil Moore